The women's high jump event at the 1981 Summer Universiade was held at the Stadionul Naţional in Bucharest on 24 and 26 July 1981.

Medalists

Results

Qualification

Final

References

Athletics at the 1981 Summer Universiade
1981